The following lists events that happened during 1919 in the Principality of Albania.

Incumbents
President: Turhan Përmeti, Chairman of the Provisional Government

Events
January
Serbs attack Albania's inhabited cities. Albanians adopt guerrilla warfare.
June
Albania denied official representation at the Paris Peace Conference; British, French, and Greek negotiators later decide to divide Albania among Greece, Italy, and Yugoslavia.

Births

Deaths

References

 
1910s in Albania
Years of the 20th century in Albania